The 2002 Historic Grand Prix of Monaco was the third running of the Historic Grand Prix of Monaco, a motor racing event for heritage Grand Prix, Voiturettes, Formula One, Formula Two and Sports cars.

Report 
The event was characterised by heavy rain during practice sessions on Saturday, resulting in some damaged cars, and dry races on Sunday.

Charles Dean overtook Julian Majzub at the start of Race A, and the two raced hard until Majzub hit the wall at St Devote, slightly injuring himself and damaging the car enough to end his race. Bart Rosman ran third but engine problems forced him to retire after 7 laps.

Race C featured Simone Stanguellini, grandson of Stanguellini founder Vittorio, at the wheel of a Stanguellini Spyder 750. He would return to the event in 2004 and 2008 driving a Formula Junior car from the marque owned by his family. Phil Hill was entered in an Alfa Romeo 3000 CM but did not take part in any sessions; he would return with the same car in 2004. Stirling Moss gave a spirited drive to twelfth, which the crowd acknowledged with a standing ovation after the finish. Richard Wills qualified third but crashed in the tunnel and was a non-starter.

Duncan Dayton led Race E for 6 laps before retiring, and led Race F but retired early with a damaged suspension.

Race G featured, for the only time in the event's history, two current F1 drivers: Alex Yoong and Takuma Sato, both seeking to gain experience of the unique circuit before their first Monaco Grand Prix. Sato crashed his Lotus 49B during a wet practice session and did not start the race; Yoong took the race lead and seemed destined for victory until his car became stuck in fifth gear during a late safety car period and Martin Stretton passed him on the final lap.

Three more F1 drivers were slated to take part: Henri Pescarolo in a Matra MS120 similar to that which he'd driven to third place in the 1970 Monaco Grand Prix, Tom Belsø in a Williams FW03 similar to his car from the 1974 Formula One season, and Danny Sullivan in a Lola Mk4. Neither would feature in the event; Sullivan's car was driven by American Howard Cherry.

Results

Summary

Série A: Pre 1934 two-seater Grand Prix cars

Série B: Pre 1952 Grand Prix cars

Série C: Pre 1959 Sports cars

Série D: Pre 1961 Grand Prix cars

Série E: Formula Junior - Rear engine

Série F: Pre 1966 Grand Prix cars

Série G: Pre 1979 Formula 1 cars

References 

Historic motorsport events
Monaco Grand Prix
Historic Grand Prix of Monaco
Historic Grand Prix of Monaco